Charles Island is an Arctic island in the Qikiqtaaluk Region, Nunavut, Canada. It is located within Hudson Strait, an arm of Hudson Bay. Charles Bay is on the north side of Charles Island. Cap de Nouvelle-France, on the Ungava Peninsula of Quebec, is directly southeast of the island.

References

 Sea islands: Atlas of Canada; Natural Resources Canada

Islands of Hudson Strait
Uninhabited islands of Qikiqtaaluk Region